Alizai also called Alizay, is an Abdālī Pashtun tribe in southern Afghanistan, Balochistan, Khyber Pakhtunkhwa, Punjab of Pakistan. It belongs to the Panjpai confederation of the larger Durrani tribe of Ahmad Shah Baba. '''Sardar Ahmed Nawaz Khan Alizai Advocate is the Chieftain of Alizai tribe. . He is a renowned lawyer, historian and politician. He resides in Mastung, Balochistan, Pakistan

Geographic distribution
In 2007, Alizai tribesmen in the village of Musa Qala in Helmand province united under Mullah Abdul Salam fought alongside the Taliban. Mullah Abdul Salam later agreed to change sides and was appointed by President Hamid Karzai as the governor of Musa Qala district.

Notable people
 Abdul Salaam Alizai - Afghan politician
 Ahmadullah Alizai - Afghani governor
 Zubair Ali Zai -  Islamic scholar, theologian 
 Muhammad Waseem - Pakistani boxer

See also
 Ishakzai

Notes and references

External links 
 Tribal Analysis Center: Ishaqzai Tribe
 Complex Operations: Alizai

Durrani Pashtun tribes